Michael John Llewellyn (born 27 November 1953) is a former Welsh cricketer. Llewellyn was a left-handed batsman who bowled right-arm off break. He was born at Clydach, Glamorgan.

References

External links
Mike Llewellyn at ESPNcricinfo
Mike Llewellyn at CricketArchive

1953 births
Living people
Cricketers from Swansea
Welsh cricketers
Glamorgan cricketers
Wiltshire cricketers